The 1970–71 international cricket season was from September 1970 to April 1971.

Season overview

November

England in Australia

February

India in the West Indies

England in New Zealand

References

International cricket competitions by season
1970 in cricket
1971 in cricket